Lady Killer is a 1933 American pre-Code crime drama film starring James Cagney, Mae Clarke, and Margaret Lindsay, based on the story "The Finger Man" by Rosalind Keating Shaffer. The picture was directed by Roy Del Ruth.

Plot

After being fired as a theater usher, Dan Quigley tracks down Myra Gale to her apartment and returns the purse she dropped. He then sits in on a poker game with her "brother-in-law", Spade Maddock, Duke, Smiley and Pete. After he loses all his money, he leaves, only to run into another person trying to return Myra's purse. Realizing he has been conned, he threatens to go to the police ... unless they let him join them, telling them he has some profitable ideas.

He is as good as his word. Eventually, they are running a nightclub and casino, a perfect cover to scout the rich as burglary targets. Dan stages a car accident so a passing "doctor" can persuade Mrs. Marley to let him rest for a while in her nearby mansion. This gives Dan an opportunity to check out the place, so that they can break in later. More burglaries follow, but Dan decides to quit when a butler is killed during the latest one. However, Pete cracks under police interrogation and betrays the others; when the police come for them, Duke kills Pete and everyone flees. Dan and Myra head to Los Angeles.

Dan is picked up for questioning at the train station, so he gives his money to Myra for safekeeping. She then runs into Spade. When Dan telephones her to have her post his bail, Spade persuades her to go with him to Mexico instead. Dan is released anyway.

Broke, he runs away from what he mistakes for a policeman, only to discover his pursuer is actually hiring extras for a film. Dan gladly accepts $3 a day and a box lunch. On his fourth day of work, he meets star Lois Underwood and is surprised to find her friendly, even to a lowly extra. Meanwhile, National Studio head Ramick is looking for fresh, "rough and ready" faces, as the public is tiring of handsome stars. One of his executives suggests Dan. Dan helps his career along by writing himself hundreds of fan letters a week, and is soon a rising star.

He and Lois start going out together. When he spots a critic who had written harsh things about Lois, he forces the man to literally eat his words, making him swallow the newspaper column, and warns him against panning Lois again. He then takes Lois home to see his new suite. However, when they unexpectedly find Myra in his bedroom, Lois leaves.

Dan throws Myra out, but she is not alone. Spade and their old gang want Dan to use his connections to get them inside stars' homes in preparation for robberies. Dan refuses, and offers them $10,000, all the money he has, to leave town and never come back. Spade has no intention of departing. When burglaries start occurring using the modus operandi of Dan's old gang, the police suspect he is the ringleader. Dan tracks the crooks down after they rob Lois. He retrieves her jewels at gunpoint, but just as he is leaving, the police arrive. He is arrested, while the others get away.

In spite of the protests of the studio bigwigs, Lois adamantly intends to pay Dan's bail and stand by him. However, Spade worries that Dan will tell all he knows and has Myra bail Dan out so they can kill him. Myra tells Dan, but he already suspected as much and had the police tail them both. After a car chase, the thieves are either dead or in custody, Dan is exonerated and he asks the authorities to guarantee leniency for Myra. Dan and Lois then fly to another state to get married without delay.

Cast
 James Cagney as Dan Quigley
 Mae Clarke as Myra Gale
 Margaret Lindsay as Lois Underwood
 Leslie Fenton as Duke
 Douglass Dumbrille as Spade Maddock
 Russell Hopton as Smiley
 Raymond Hatton as Pete
 Henry O'Neill as Ramick
 Robert Elliott as Detective Joe Brannigan
 Marjorie Gateson as Mrs. Marley
 Willard Robertson as Detective Conroy
 William Davidson as Director Williams
 Edwin Maxwell as Jeffries  
 Robert Homans as Jailer (uncredited)
 Olaf Hytten as Butler (uncredited) 
 Sam McDaniel as Porter (uncredited)

Release
The film received mixed reviews at the time of its release, as reflected in a collection of excerpts published in The Hollywood Reporter: the World-Telegram called it "a sprightly, more or less daring, thoroughly entertaining film," while less favorable reviewers dismissed it as "premeditated hokum" and "more a collection of jokes than a sustained narrative." Cagney's performance, however, was unanimously praised.

References

External links
 
 
 
 

1933 films
1930s crime comedy-drama films
American black-and-white films
1930s English-language films
Films about actors
Films directed by Roy Del Ruth
Films set in Los Angeles
Films set in New York City
Warner Bros. films
American crime comedy-drama films
American crime drama films
1930s American films